Panditrao Ramrao Deshmukh  commonly known as Guruji, was a member of the Maharashtra Legislative Assembly. He represented Basmath (Vidhan Sabha constituency). He got elected in 1978 Maharashtra Legislative Assembly election.

Positions held
 Secretary,  Bahirjee Smarak Education Society, Basmath.
 Director, Purna Cooperative Sugar Factory, Basmath
 Head Master, Bahirjee College, Basmath

See also 
Baburao Narsingrao Kokate (Adaskar)
 Vilasrao Deshmukh

References 

Maharashtra MLAs 1978–1980
People from Hingoli district
Living people
Year of birth missing (living people)